The 2014 Newfoundland and Labrador Tankard, the men's provincial curling championship for Newfoundland and Labrador, was held from January 29 to February 2 at the Bally Haly Golf & Curling Club in St. John's, Newfoundland and Labrador. The winning team, skipped by Brad Gushue, represented Newfoundland and Labrador at the 2014 Tim Hortons Brier in Kamloops, British Columbia.

Teams

Round-robin standings
Final round-robin standings

Round-robin results
All draw times are listed in Newfoundland Standard Time (UTC−3:30).

Draw 1
Wednesday, January 29, 7:30 pm

Draw 2
Thursday, January 30, 2:00 pm

Draw 3
Thursday, January 30, 7:30 pm

Draw 4
Friday, January 31, 2:30 pm

Draw 5
Friday, January 31, 8:00 pm

Tiebreakers
Saturday, February 1, 9:00 am

Saturday, February 1, 2:00 pm

Final
Saturday, February 1, 7:30 pm

External links
Scores

Newfoundland and Labrador Tankard
Sport in St. John's, Newfoundland and Labrador
Newfoundland and Labrador Tankard
Newfoundland and Labrador Tankard
Curling in Newfoundland and Labrador